Peflin is a protein that in humans is encoded by the PEF1 gene.

PEF1 is a Ca(2+)-binding protein that belongs to the penta-EF hand (PEF) protein family, which includes the calpain small subunit (CAPNS1; MIM 114170), sorcin (SRI; MIM 182520), grancalcin (GCA; MIM 607030), and ALG2 (PDCD6; MIM 601057) (Kitaura et al., 2001).[supplied by OMIM]

Interactions
PEF1 has been shown to interact with PDCD6.

References

Further reading

Penta-EF-hand proteins